The Jacobin is a breed of fancy pigeon developed over many years of selective breeding that originated in Asia.  Jacobins, along with other varieties of domesticated pigeons, are all descendants of the rock pigeon (Columba livia). It is in the Asian feather and voice pigeon show group.
The breed is known for its feathered hood over its head. 

The breed name comes from the feather arrangements on their heads (known as a muff or cowl) that look similar to the hoods that Jacobin monks wore.

See also 

List of pigeon breeds

References

Pigeon breeds
Pigeon breeds originating in India